African Para Table Tennis Championships are a biennial sport event for para table tennis players who represent an African country. It was originally called the Africa/Middle East Championships from 1999 to 2005. Players from the Middle East now compete in Asian Para Table Tennis Championships since 2005.

Locations

All-time medal count
As of 2019.

See also
World Para Table Tennis Championships
African Table Tennis Championships

References

Table tennis competitions
Para table tennis
Recurring sporting events established in 1999